Dante XXI is the tenth studio album by the Brazilian metal band Sepultura, released in 2006 through SPV Records. It is a concept album based on the three sections of Dante Alighieri's The Divine Comedy; Inferno (hell), Purgatorio (purgatory) and Paradiso (paradise). This is the last album to feature Igor Cavalera on drums.

Album information
Dante XXI was originally titled "Dante 05", but was changed when it became clear that the album would not be released by the end of 2005. The first single from the album was "Convicted in Life". A video for the song was released in 2006, and it won the MTV VMB Best Editing in a Video Award that year. In January 2008 the band released a music video for the song "Ostia". The album artwork was done by Stephan Doitschinoff, whom the band commissioned to do 10 paintings based on the Divine Comedy.

Covers of Judas Priest's "Screaming for Vengeance" and Sick of It All's "Scratch the Surface" have been recorded as B-sides. "Screaming for Vengeance" was added as a Japanese bonus track, while "Scratch the Surface" is included on the SOIA tribute album Our Impact Will Be Felt.
The Brazilian edition (Krako records), contains two bonus tracks: "Mindwar" (recorded live from Stanley Soares's mixing desk in Ehfurt/Germany, December 3, 2004 on tour with Motorhead) and "False" (demo recorded at High Five Studio São Paulo, during pre production for Dante XXI July 2005).

Reception 

Many critics stated that it was the best Derrick Green-era Sepultura album thus far. Chad Bowar from About.com praised the album for its intensity and commented that it "brings the thrash at full blast". He also highlighted Green's vocal performance, as well as the album's overall concept. AllMusic's Steve Huey noted that much of the elements that made Sepultura "stand out from the metal pack" are still present on this record, and that this was one of Sepultura's strongest releases with Green on vocals.

Alternative Press reviewer Phil Freeman stated that with this album, Sepultura are "finally back at full strength", giving the listener "exactly what he hopes to get from pioneers in the art of skull-crushing". In a mixed review for Stylus Magazine, Cosmo Lee said that the riffs were "unmemorable" and the songs lacked "tension and release". He also criticized the album's artwork, describing it as a "weak, mild-mannered font worthy of indie rock".

Despite mostly positive reviews, sales of the album were disappointing and continued the decrease in sales of Sepultura's albums since Against, selling only 2,300 copies its first week of release in the US. Dante XXI has sold 120,000+ copies worldwide as of January 2, 2008 and went Gold in Brazil and Cyprus (their first music industry certification outside of Brazil since Roots).

According to Matthew Teutsch, a scholar of literature and popular culture, the album is "a modern-day soundtrack for Dante’s Divine Comedy" and allows an exploration of the poem "through an aesthetic rendering of twenty-first-century national (and international) issues".

Track listing

Chart performance 
Album - Billboard (North America)

Album - Music recording sales certifications

Credits

Sepultura
 Derrick Green - vocals
 Andreas Kisser - guitars
 Paulo Jr. - bass
 Igor Cavalera - drums, percussion

Additional personnel

Horns
 Luiz Garcia 
 Samuel Hamzem

Cellists
 Fabio Presgrave 
 Bia Rebello

Crew
 Guilherme Cersosimo 
 Estevam Romera 
 Rogerinho Motorhead 
 Pedro Verdone

Others
 André Moraes - percussion, piano, programming, sitar, Fender Rhodes, horns arrangements, strings arrangements, introduction, minimoog, production
 Andreas Kisser - horns arrangements, strings arrangements
 Stephan Doitschinoff - paintings
 Mauricio Cersosimo - pre-production
 Susanne Kammer - design
 Stanley Soares - producer, engineer, mixing

Assistants
 Fragata
 Helio Leite

References

External links 
 Official SPV Dante XXI Site

Sepultura albums
2006 albums
Concept albums
SPV/Steamhammer albums
Music based on Inferno (Dante)
Works based on Purgatorio
Works based on Paradiso (Dante)